The Natural Park of Posets–Maladeta is a Natural park located in northern Province of Huesca, Aragón, northeastern Spain. It is set within the Pyrenees .

Geography

Gallery
.

See also

Natural park (Spain)
Index: Natural parks of Spain
Protected areas of Aragón

References

Natural parks of Spain
Geography of the Province of Huesca
Protected areas of the Pyrenees
Protected areas of Aragon
Pyrenees conifer and mixed forests